Bob Herwig (December 12, 1914 – December 14, 1974) was an American football center.  He was elected to the College Football Hall of Fame in 1964.

Until their divorce in 1946, he was married to novelist Kathleen Winsor.

References

External links

1914 births
1974 deaths
Players of American football from California
American football centers
California Golden Bears football players
California Golden Bears men's basketball players
University of Arizona alumni
All-American college men's basketball players
United States Marine Corps personnel of World War II
Recipients of the Navy Cross (United States)
Recipients of the Silver Star
College Football Hall of Fame inductees
People from Kern County, California
American men's basketball players
United States Marine Corps officers
United States Marine Corps reservists